The Singapore national netball team are the national netball team representing Singapore. The Singapore team have competed at seven World Netball Championships (1967, 1975, 1999, 2007, 2011, 2015 and 2019). They have also won two Nations Cup titles (2005, 2006). In 2005, the Singaporean team won the Asian Netball Championship with a win over the Malaysian team, scoring 53–39 in the finals.

As of 30 June 2019, Singapore are 26th on the INF World Rankings. They are currently coached by Annete Pearce from New Zealand, and captained by Vanessa Marie Lee.

Players
The following twelve players represented Singapore at the 2019 Netball World Cup. Charmaine Soh replaced Vanessa Marie Lee as the captain to lead the national side in the tournament.

Charmaine Soh (captain)
Aqilah Andin (vice captain)
Kimberly Lim
Melody Teo
Sindhu Nair
Kai Wei Toh
Joanna Toh
Carmen Goh
Shawallah Rashid
Pei Shan Lee
Shuyi Kwok
Xinyi Tan

The following twelve players were selected for the 2017 Southeast Asian Games.

Competitive history

Head coaches

References

Netball
National netball teams of Asia
Netball in Singapore
Australian Netball League teams